Sabotage is an act of destruction or interference intended to weaken an opponent.

Sabotage may also refer to:

Video games
 Sabotage (video game), a 1981 computer game for the Apple II
 Velvet Assassin, a 2008 computer game known as Sabotage early in development

Films
 Sabotage (1936 film), a British film by Alfred Hitchcock
 Sabotage (1939 film), an American action film 
Sabotage (1966 film), the ninth installment of the Filipino film series featuring Agent X-44, starring Tony Ferrer
 Sabotage (1996 film), a martial arts film with Mark Dacascos
 Sabotage! (film), a 2000 comedy film about the battle of Waterloo, with David Suchet as Napoleon
 Sabotage (2014 film), an American action thriller/crime drama film

Literature 
 Bureau of Sabotage, a fictional government entity invented by author Frank Herbert

Television
 "Sabotage" (Stargate Universe), a first season episode of Stargate Universe
 Sabotage (Brooklyn Nine-Nine), an episode of the American television sitcom Brooklyn Nine-Nine
 "Sabotage" (Star Wars: The Clone Wars), a fifth season episode of Star Wars: The Clone Wars

Music
 Sabotage (rapper) (1973–2003), Brazilian rapper
 Sabotage (Black Sabbath album), a 1975 album by Black Sabbath
 Sabotage (EP), an EP by Cancer Bats
 Sabotage (Klinik album), a 1985 album by Klinik
 Sabotage (Master Joe y O.G. Black album), a 2004 album by Master Joe y O.G. Black
 "Sabotage" (Beastie Boys song), 1994
 "Sabotage" (Kristinia DeBarge song)
 "Sabotage" (JoJo song), 2019
 "Sabotage" (Bebe Rexha song)
 "Sabotage", a song by Suede on their 2013 album Bloodsports